M. proximus may refer to:
 Menemerus proximus, a jumping spider species in the genus Menemerus
 Merenius proximus, a corinnid sac spider species in the genus Merenius
 Mermessus proximus, a money spider species in the genus Mermessus
 Microgadus proximus, a fish species in the genus Microgadus

See also
 Proximus (disambiguation)